The 2003–04 Polish Cup was the fiftieth season of the annual Polish cup competition. It began on 26 July 2003 with the preliminary round and ended on 1 June 2004 with second leg of the final, played at Stadion Wojska Polskiego, Warsaw. The winners qualified for the second qualifying round of the UEFA Cup. Wisła Kraków were the defending champions.

Preliminary round 
The matches took place on 26 July 2003.

! colspan="3" style="background:cornsilk;"|26 July 2003

|}
Notes
Note 1: Stomil Olsztyn withdrew from the competition.

Round 1 
The matches took place on 29 July 2003.

! colspan="3" style="background:cornsilk;"|29 July 2003

|}

Round 2 
The matches took place on 2 and 20 August 2003.

! colspan="3" style="background:cornsilk;"|2 August 2003

|-
! colspan="3" style="background:cornsilk;"|20 August 2003

|}

Round 3 
The matches took place on 16 and 17 September 2003.

! colspan="3" style="background:cornsilk;"|16 September 2003

|-
! colspan="3" style="background:cornsilk;"|17 September 2003

|}

Quarter-finals 
The first legs took place on 30 September and 1 October, when the second legs took place on 21 and 22 October 2003.

|}

Semi-finals 
The first legs took place on 7 and 13 April, when the second legs took place on 14 and 22 April 2004.

|}

Notes
The game was stopped in the 81st minute when the score was 2–0 and then was awarded 3–0 to Legia.

Final

First leg

Second leg 

Lech Poznań won 2–1 on aggregate

References

External links 
 90minut.pl 

Polish Cup seasons
Polish Cup
Cup